The International Council of Chemical Associations (ICCA) is the trade association of the global chemical industry. Its members are both regional trade associations like Cefic or the Gulf Petrochemicals and Chemicals Association, and also national associations including the American Chemistry Council.

According to its own figures, ICCA represents chemical companies which account for more than 75% of the global production capacities, making more than US$1.6 trillion in revenues each year.

ICCA is the steward of Responsible Care, a voluntary scheme to improve chemical safety among its members. Responsible Care had been launched by the Chemistry Industry Association of Canada in 1985. At the 2006 International Conference on Chemicals Management, Responsible Care was extended through a Global Product Strategy and a Global Charter.

References

External links
ICCA website

International business organizations
Chemistry trade associations